William M. Pizor (1890–1959) was a pioneering film producer who also had a distribution company, Imperial Distributing Corporation. He was also president of production company Imperial Pictures. His son Irwin Pizor succeeded him in the film business.

He handled Westerns, documentaries, and foreign films he distributed in the U.S. Pizor made a deal with producer Louis Weiss to purchase 8 2-reel westerns.

Pizor produced a narrated  travelogue short film about Olvera Street in 1937 titled A Street of Memory. It is extant.

Filmography
A Chocolate Cowboy (1925)
Gasoline Cowboy (1926)
Was He Guilty? (1927)
Harem Scarem (1927)
The Mansion of Mystery (1927
The Rustler's End (1928)
Flash of the Forest (1928)
Heave-Ho, an extant Sid Smith and Teddy Reavis comedy
The Tom-Boy, a comedy with Teddy Reavis. Extant.
Trails of Treachery (1928) starring Montana Bill
The House of Terror (1928) starring Fat O'Brien and Dorothy Tallcott
The Sea Feast (1929)
Raffles N' Rubber (1931)
Secret Menace (1931)
Ragus Yugo-Slavia (1931)Heroes All (1931), reissue with sound of 1920 documentaryTwo Gun Caballero (1931)Ubangi (1931)Garden Granary (1931)Blonde Captive (1932)Virgins of Bali (1932)The Texan (1932)The Galloping Kid (1932)Love's Memorial, Agra, India (1933)The Seventh Wonder (1933Corruption (1933)The Flaming Signal (1933)The Throne of the Gods (1933)Call of the Coyote (1934)The Woman Who Dared (1933)The Lone Rider (1934)Arizona Cyclone (1934)Port O'Call /  City of the Sun (1934)
Pals of the Prairie (1934)
The Way of the West (1934)
Napoleon's Waterloo (1934)
Twisted Rails (1934)
Wild Waters (1934)
Pals of the West (1934)
Carrying the Mail (1934)
Sundown Trail (1934)
After the Storm (1935 film) (1935)
Manhattan Butterfly (1935)
The Broken Coin (1936)
Paradise Valley (1936)
Gateway to the North (1937)
A Street of Memory, a narrated travelogue about Olvera Street in Los Angeles

See also
Poverty Row

References

External links
 

American film production company founders
1959 deaths
1890 births